14-Ethoxymetopon is an opioid analog that is a derivative of metopon which has been substituted with an ethoxy group at the 14-position. It is a highly potent analgesic drug several hundred times more potent than morphine.

References 

Semisynthetic opioids
4,5-Epoxymorphinans
Phenols
Ketones
Ethers
Mu-opioid receptor agonists